Climax Studios is a British video game developer based in Portsmouth that is best known for their work on the 2004 action role-playing game Sudeki and the 2007 and 2009 survival horror video games Silent Hill: Origins and Silent Hill: Shattered Memories from the Silent Hill franchise.

History
Climax was founded by Karl Jeffery on 3 February 1988. It was originally known as Images Software Ltd., and its initial focus was on developing and porting games for the generation of home computers, consoles and handhelds.

In October 1998, Climax announced the establishment of Climax PC Studio, a sub-studio focused on personal computer game development and located in an office next to Climax's headquarters. Another such studio, Climax Game Boy World, was launched during E3 1999 and focused on the development for the Game Boy family of handheld game devices. Pixel Planet, a Brighton-based studio founded in September 1999 by Tony Beckwith and Greg Michael, entered into a partnership with Climax in November 1999 that saw Pixel Planet become part of the Climax group, being renamed Climax Brighton. This was followed up by Nottingham-based Anthill Studios, which was acquired in June 2000 and renamed "Climax Nottingham". The studio, under the continued leadership of founder Paul Carruthers, was put in charge of the game Warhammer Online, based on Games Workshop's Warhammer franchise. By this point, the main studios in the Climax group's Fareham headquarters had been consolidated under "Climax Fareham". The Climax Brighton studio moved to Hove in August 2000. When the studio Charybdis saw large redundancies in staff in April 2001, Climax announced its intent to hire 20 of its former staff at the Nottingham studio. Climax also acquired Syrox Developments of Kingston-upon-Thames in June 2001. In July 2001, Geoff Heath was named Climax's chairman.

The flagship Climax Fareham studio moved to Portsmouth, into offices in the Gunwharf Quays centre, in July 2002, being renamed "Climax Solent". The administrative portion of the Climax group remained in Fareham. A fifth studio based in Venice, California was opened in October 2003. In November 2004, Climax consolidated its London and Solent studios under the name "Climax Action" and rebranded the Brighton and Nottingham studios as "Climax Racing" and "Climax Online", respectively.

In 2006 Konami announced that Climax Action was working on the next entry in the popular Silent Hill franchise of horror games after the original team behind the series, Konami's internal development team Team Silent, had been disbanded. It was titled Silent Hill: Origins and exclusively announced for the PlayStation Portable. In October 2007 the game was released to positive reviews. In 2008 a PlayStation 2 version of the game followed.

Climax's Kingston studio was closed in February 2008, leaving the Portsmouth headquarters as the only remaining studio.

In 2009 it was announced that Climax was working on another Silent Hill game for Nintendo's Wii console titled Shattered Memories. The game was announced as a remake of the original Silent Hill game, although the term "re-imagining" was used to emphasise that it was going to provide a completely new experience. Later versions for the PlayStation 2 and PlayStation Portable were also announced.

In recent years Climax has developed and published a number of VR titles, including Lola and The Giant (which was featured at Google's I/O'17 event), Bandit Six, Gun Sight, DCL: The Game and Dirt Rally 2.0 which was co-developed with Codemasters.

In 2007, following a rumor that had been going around the industry about a possible sale of the company, Jeffrey confirmed that he had owned 100% of the studio's shares, denying any of the rumors about an acquisition.

Former development subsidiaries
 Climax PC Studio - Established Oct 1998.
 Climax Game Boy World - Established July 1999.
 Climax Racing (Climax Brighton) - Formerly Pixel Planet; partnership entered into September 1999. Sold to Buena Vista Games in September 2006 and later renamed to Black Rock Studio. 
 Climax Online (Climax Nottingham) - Formerly Anthill Studios; acquired June 2000.
 Climax Kingston - Formerly Syrox Developments; acquired June 2001. Closed in February 2008.
 Climax Action (Climax Fareham and Climax London) - Consolidated November 2004.

Games developed

References

External links
 

1988 establishments in England
2021 mergers and acquisitions
British companies established in 1988
British subsidiaries of foreign companies
Companies based in Portsmouth
Keywords Studios
Video game companies established in 1988
Video game companies of the United Kingdom
Video game development companies